Xia Kangnan (born 13 July 1988 in Zhejiang) is a Chinese baseball pitcher for the Shanghai Eagles. He was a member of the China national baseball team in the 2009 World Baseball Classic.

References

1988 births
Living people
Chinese baseball players
2009 World Baseball Classic players
Sportspeople from Zhejiang